Walnut Creek is an intermittent stream in Hidalgo County, New Mexico. Its mouth is located at an elevation of  where it subsides into the Playas Valley.

References

Rivers of Hidalgo County, New Mexico
Rivers of New Mexico